Sport Clube Maria da Fonte  (abbreviated as SC Maria da Fonte) is a Portuguese football club based in Póvoa de Lanhoso in the district of Braga.

Background
SC Maria da Fonte currently plays in the Terceira Divisão Série A which is the fourth tier of Portuguese football. The club was founded in 1925 and they play their home matches at the Campo dos Moínhos Novos in Póvoa de Lanhoso. The stadium is able to accommodate 1,500 spectators.

The club is affiliated to Associação de Futebol de Braga and has competed in the AF Braga Taça. The club has also entered the national cup competition known as Taça de Portugal on occasions.

Season to season

League and cup history

Honours
Terceira Divisão: 2005/06 (Série A)
AF Braga Taça: 1973/74, 1974/75, 1978/79

Footnotes

External links
Official website 

Football clubs in Portugal
Association football clubs established in 1925
1925 establishments in Portugal